Brooks School is a private, co-educational, college-preparatory boarding school in North Andover, Massachusetts on the shores of Lake Cochichewick.

History
Brooks School was founded in 1926 by Endicott Peabody, the headmaster of Groton School at the time, and was named after Phillips Brooks (1835–1893), a well-known clergyman and author who spent summers in North Andover, Massachusetts, and briefly served as Bishop of Massachusetts in the Episcopal Church during the 1890s.

The school opened on September 29, 1927, with fourteen boys in the first and second forms (seventh and eighth grades), two masters, a headmaster and headmistress, and one dormitory. The school added one form (grade) each year thereafter until it comprised grades 7–12, denoted by the British educational notations, Forms I, II, III, IV, V, and VI, respectively. Forms I and II (seventh and eighth grades) were later dropped.

Brooks School has had just four heads of school in over 80 years. The School's first headmaster, Frank D. Ashburn (a graduate of Groton School, Yale University and Columbia Law School), was appointed at the age of 25 and served for 46 years until his retirement in 1973. Ashburn was succeeded by H. Peter Aitken who served until 1986 when Lawrence W. Becker succeeded him. Becker, who stepped down in 2008, was succeeded by John R. Packard, previously the Dean of Faculty.

The school started admitting day students in the early 1950s and became co-educational in 1979. Today, the school enrolls 185 boys and 160 girls who come from many states and foreign countries. There has been a steady increase of students of color and of international students, and the school aspires to achieve gender equality. In addition, approximately 20 percent of students receive financial aid.

Notable alumni

 Bill Chisholm ‘87, Private Equity investor - founding partner -Symphony Technology Group (STG)
 Barry Bingham, Jr. (1933–2006), United States newspaper publisher and television and radio executive, the last descendant of the Bingham family that controlled Louisville, Kentucky's daily newspapers, a television station, and two radio stations for much of the 20th century
 Frank Blake '67, American businessman and lawyer, CEO and Chairman of Home Depot
 Jake Burton Carpenter, founder and chairman of Burton Snowboards
 Gene Clapp, silver medalist 1972 Summer Olympics men's eight
 Charlie Davies '04, United States professional soccer striker who played for the New England Revolution and Philadelphia Union, 2008 Olympian.
 William R. Ferris '60, United States author and scholar, former chairman of the National Endowment for the Humanities, co-founder of the Center for Southern Folklore in Memphis, Tennessee, co-founder of the Center for the Study of Southern Culture at the University of Mississippi, co-editor of The Encyclopedia of Southern Culture
 Steve Forbes '66, son of Malcolm Forbes, president and CEO of Forbes, editor-in-chief of Forbes magazine, former Republican candidate in the United States presidential primaries in 1996 and 2000
 Mike Fucito '04, United States retired professional soccer striker.
 Robert L. Gerry, III '56, American businessman
 William W. Kellogg, Ph.D. '35, geophysicist, meteorologist
 John LeBoutillier, '71, former U.S. Congressman and political columnist
 Nekima Levy-Pounds, '94, lawyer, professor, former president of the Minneapolis chapter of the NAACP, and mayoral candidate of the 2017 Minneapolis mayoral election 
 Elle Logan '06, United States rower, Olympic gold medalist, 2008 Summer Olympics, rowing
 Henry Lyman '33, conservationist, publisher
 Daniel Lyons, journalist and the Fake Steve Jobs
 Esmond Bradley Martin '59, conservationist 
 Anthony Perkins, actor
 Thomas Collier Platt, Jr. '43, grandson of Thomas C. Platt, a federal judge for the United States District Court for the Eastern District of New York, former chief judge of the United States District Court for the Eastern District of New York
 Tim Prentice, sculptor
 Lorenzo Semple, Jr. '40, screenwriter
 Huntington Sheldon, Dr. '47, medicine
 Mark Shuttleworth, South African entrepreneur, first African in space, founder of Canonical Ltd., providing leadership for the Ubuntu Linux distribution
 Parker Stevenson, actor
 Michael Weatherly, actor
 Pat Freiermuth, Tight end for the Pittsburgh Steelers

External links  
 Official website
 
 Brooks School on Instagram. Archived from the original on ghostarchive.org

References

Buildings and structures in North Andover, Massachusetts
Boarding schools in Massachusetts
Private high schools in Massachusetts
Private preparatory schools in Massachusetts
Educational institutions established in 1926
Schools in Essex County, Massachusetts
1926 establishments in Massachusetts
Episcopal schools in the United States